Ryan Kelley Goeb Patrick (born 1979) is an American attorney and former district judge who served as the United States Attorney for the Southern District of Texas from 2018 to 2021. He was confirmed by the U.S. Senate in December 2017 and assumed office early the following year.

Early life and education 
Patrick was born in Washington, D.C., while his father, Dan Patrick, was working as a radio host at WTTG. He graduated from Baylor University in 2001 and earned a Juris Doctor degree from South Texas College of Law Houston in 2006.

Career 
Patrick served as a political director for the Harris County Republican Party from 2002 to 2004 and as an assistant district attorney for Harris County from 2006 to 2012. In 2012, Texas Governor Rick Perry appointed Patrick to be a judge at the 177th state district court, and Patrick was elected to the position in 2012, though he lost the seat in 2016 in an election sweep by Democrats after winning a four-year term in November 2012. Patrick subsequently returned to private practice.

Patrick swore-in his father as the 42nd Lieutenant Governor of Texas at his inauguration ceremony in 2015.

In July 2017, the Trump administration selected Patrick to serve as the U.S. Attorney for the Southern District of Texas, and U.S. President Donald Trump made his nomination official on November 1, 2017. The United States Senate confirmed Patrick by voice vote on December 20, 2017. He assumed office on January 8, 2018, and his investiture ceremony occurred on September 18, 2018.

On February 8, 2021, he along with 55 other Trump-era attorneys were asked to resign. On February 22, he submitted his resignation, effective February 28.

On March 22, 2021, Patrick joined the Houston office of international law firm Haynes and Boone, LLP as a partner in their white collar and government investigations practice.

Personal life 
Patrick and his wife have four children and live in Houston, Texas.

References

External links

Official DOJ profile

1979 births
Living people
Baylor University alumni
County district attorneys in Texas
Lawyers from Washington, D.C.
People from Harris County, Texas
South Texas College of Law alumni
Texas Republicans
Texas state court judges
Trump administration personnel
United States Attorneys for the Southern District of Texas
21st-century American judges